Freifjorden is a fjord in Møre og Romsdal county, Norway. The fjord begins near the island of Tustna and flows southwest between the islands of Nordlandet and Frei on the west side and the mainland peninsula of Straumsnes and the islands of Aspøya and Bergsøya on the east side. The Kvernesfjorden lies at the west end of the Freifjorden, near the Freifjord Tunnel. The villages of Nedre Frei and Kvalvåg are located on the western shore of the fjord.

See also
 List of Norwegian fjords

References

Fjords of Møre og Romsdal
Kristiansund
Tingvoll
Gjemnes